120 North LaSalle is a 501 ft (153m) high-rise office building in Chicago, Illinois. It was constructed from 1989 to 1992. It is the 89th tallest building in the city.

The building is LEED Gold-certified under the LEED EB&OM (Existing Buildings & Operations and Maintenance) program.

Above the main entrance is a mosaic mural, by artist Roger Brown, depicting Daedalus and Icarus. It was commissioned by the architects and Ahmanson Commercial Development Company in 1991.

See also
List of tallest buildings in Chicago

References

Chicago Architecture 

Skyscraper office buildings in Chicago
Office buildings completed in 1992
Helmut Jahn buildings
Leadership in Energy and Environmental Design gold certified buildings
1992 establishments in Illinois